Lublin is a Hasidic dynasty founded by Rebbe Yehudo Leib Eiger of Lublin, a town in Poland.

Lineage 
Rebbe Yehuda Leib Eiger was a son of Rabbi Shlomo Eiger of Posen, and a grandson of Rabbi Akiva Eger.

References 

Hasidic dynasties of Poland
Jews and Judaism in Lublin